The Best Nine Award is awarded annually to the best player at each position in both the Central League and Pacific League of Japanese professional baseball as determined by a pool of journalists.

History
While the Best Nine Award was first presented to players following the  season, it was not until  (after World War II) that it became an annual award. After the Japanese Baseball League was divided into Central and Pacific leagues in 1950, the award was presented to nine players from each league.

Selection process
Journalists vote on the best pitcher, catcher, first baseman, second baseman, third baseman, shortstop, and three outfielders (typically chosen on merit of best offensive numbers, with the exception of pitchers) in each of the two leagues. As is the case with the Silver Slugger Award, said to be the Major League equivalent of the award, left fielders, center fielders, and right fielders are not chosen separately.

Voters for the award are chosen from journalists employed by national newspaper, broadcast, or communication outlets with five or more years of experience in covering professional baseball. Each voter selects one player at each position in each league; the player with the most votes at each position receives the Best Nine Award. Until 2004, the winning players of the award were announced two days after the final game of the Japan Series; from 2005 onwards, the winners have been announced at the Professional Baseball Convention, the NPB's annual awards ceremony.

Because of the nature of the voting process, it is possible, although exceedingly rare, that two or more players may end up with the same number of votes at any given position. In 2004, Masahiro Araki of the Chunichi Dragons and Greg LaRocca, then of the Hiroshima Carp, were tied for most votes for the Central League second baseman, the first time a tie had occurred since the current two-league system was adopted.

In addition, it is also possible that a players ends up with the most votes at more than one position in the same season. In , then-Nankai Hawks infielder Yasuhiro Kunisada ended up with the most votes at both second base and third base in the Pacific League. He only received the award at second base, and the award for best third baseman went to Tony Roig of the Nishitetsu Lions. In , Shohei Ohtani of Hokkaido Nippon-Ham Fighters received the awards at pitcher and DH.

Other notes
In the Central League, the pitcher that receives the Best Nine Award is also named the league's Most Valuable Pitcher. This is not the case in the Pacific League, where the pitcher with the highest winning percentage (among those that have thrown the required number of innings) is named the Most Valuable Pitcher.

See also

Baseball awards#Japan

References

Nippon Professional Baseball trophies and awards
Awards established in 1940